Yi-Ren Ng (born September 21, 1979) is a Malaysian American scientist who is an assistant professor in the Department of Electrical Engineering & Computer Sciences at the University of California, Berkeley. He was the founder, executive chairman and CEO of Lytro, a Mountain View, California-based startup company. Lytro was developing consumer light-field cameras based on Ng's graduate research at Stanford University. Lytro ceased operations in late March 2018.

Biography
Ng was born in Malaysia, and immigrated to Australia at the age of 9. He earned a B.S. degree in mathematical and computational science in 2001, an M.S. in computer science in 2002, and a Ph.D. in computer science in 2006, all from Stanford University. His doctoral dissertation, titled Digital Light Field Photography, received the 2006 ACM Doctoral Dissertation Award.

Business career
Ng interned at Microsoft from June 2000 to September 2000 and June 2003 to September 2003 while studying at Stanford. After graduation in 2006, Ng founded Lytro and was CEO for more than six years. On June 29, 2012, Ng announced that he would step aside as CEO in order to spend more time on the vision for the company and less on its day-to-day operations. Ng also would become executive chairman and remain at Lytro full-time. Charles Chi, then executive chairman, served as interim CEO until Ng chose former Ning chief Jason Rosenthal as Lytro's new CEO in March 2013 after a lengthy external search.

Academic
In 2013 Ng was awarded the Royal Photographic Society's Selwyn Award given to those under the age of 35 years who have conducted successful science-based research connected with imaging.

In July 2015, Ng became an assistant professor in the Department of Electrical Engineering & Computer Sciences at College of Engineering of University of California, Berkeley.

References

External links
 Lytro - Home
 Ren Ng EECS Profile at UC Berkeley

Malaysian emigrants to Australia
Australian emigrants to the United States
American chairpersons of corporations
Living people
Australian chief executives
Stanford University School of Engineering alumni
UC Berkeley College of Engineering faculty
1979 births
American scientists